Douglas Francis Theodore Morkel (1885–1950), was a South African international rugby union player. He was one of Paul Roos 1906 touring Springboks.

Biography
Morkel was born in Kimberley in 1886, but as a child moved to Johannesburg with his parents. In 1903 he played for the Witwatersrand team against the touring team from the British Isles. He made his test debut against  on 24 November 1906 in Belfast.

Morkel played in two test matches against the 1910 British Isles team and captained the Springboks in the first test in Johannesburg. He again toured with the Springboks to Europe in 1912–13, playing in all five test matches and also captained the team against . In addition to the 9 test matches that Morkel played, he also played 31 tour matches, in which he scored 99 points.

Test history 

Legend: try (3 pts); pen = penalty (3 pts.); conv = conversion (2 pts.), drop = drop kick (4 pts.).

See also
List of South Africa national rugby union players – Springbok no. 106

References

External links
Springbok Rugby Hall of Fame

South African rugby union players
South Africa international rugby union players
1885 births
1950 deaths
Rugby union forwards
Rugby union players from Kimberley, Northern Cape
Golden Lions players